The Bloody Island Massacre was a mass killing of indigenous Californians by the US Military that occurred on an island in Clear Lake, California, on May 15, 1850. It is part of the wider California genocide.

A number of the Pomo, an indigenous people of California, had been enslaved by two settlers, Andrew Kelsey and Charles Stone, and confined to one village, where they were starved and abused until they rebelled and murdered their captors. In response, the U.S. Cavalry murdered at least 60 of the local Pomo. In July 1850, by Major Edwin Allen Sherman contended that “There were not less than four hundred warriors killed and drowned at Clear Lake and as many more of squaws and children who plunged into the lake and drowned, through fear, committing suicide. So in all, about eight hundred Native Americans found a watery grave in Clear Lake.” [Source: Page 132, An American Genocide: The United States and the California Indian Catastrophe, Benjamin Madley, Yale University Press, 2016].

Background
The Bloody Island Massacre (also called the Clear Lake Massacre) occurred on an island called in the Pomo language, Bo-no-po-ti or Badon-napo-ti (Island Village), at the north end of Clear Lake, Lake County, California, on May 15, 1850. It was a place where the Pomo had traditionally gathered for the spring fish spawn. After this event, it became known as Bloody Island.

A number of Pomo, primarily members living in the Big Valley area, had been enslaved, interned, and severely abused by settlers Andrew Kelsey (namesake of Kelsey Creek and Kelseyville, California) and Charles Stone. Kelsey and Stone purchased cattle running free in Big Valley from Salvador Vallejo in 1847. They captured and impressed local Pomo to work as vaqueros (cowboys). They also forced them to build them a permanent shelter with promises for rations that were not kept. Because they made a residence there, their treatment of the Pomo was more brutal than had been Vallejo's, though the massacred Pomos at Anderson Island might have argued that point. The people were eventually confined to a village surrounded by a stockade and were not allowed weapons or fishing implements. Families starved on the meager rations they provided only four cups of wheat a day for a family. When one young man asked for more wheat for his sick mother, Stone reportedly killed him. In the fall of 1849, Kelsey forced 50 Pomo men to work as laborers on a second gold-seeking expedition to the Placer gold fields. Kelsey became ill with malaria and sold the rations to other miners. The Pomo starved, and only one or two men returned alive.

Stone and Kelsey regularly forced the Pomo parents to bring their daughters to them to be sexually abused. If they refused they were whipped mercilessly. A number of them died from that abuse. Both men indentured and abused the Pomo women. The starving Pomo became so desperate that

Massacre
On May 15, 1850, a contingent from the 1st Dragoons Regiment of the United States Cavalry under Nathaniel Lyon, then still a lieutenant, and Lieutenant J. W. Davidson tried to locate Augustine's band to punish them. When they instead came upon a group of Pomo on Badon-napoti (later called Bloody Island), they killed old men, women and children. 

The soldiers under Davidson's command arrived "with orders to proceed against the Clear Lake Indians, and exterminate if possible the tribe."The National Park Service has estimated the army killed 60 of 400 Pomo; other accounts say 200 were killed. Most of the younger men were off in the mountains to the north, hunting. Some of the dead were relatives of the Habematolel Pomo of Upper Lake and the Robinson Rancheria of Pomo Indians of California. The army killed 75 more of the Pomo along the Russian River.

One of the Pomo survivors of the massacre was a 6-year-old girl named Ni'ka, or Lucy Moore. She hid underwater and breathed through a tule reed. Her descendants formed the Lucy Moore Foundation to work for better relations between the Pomo and other residents of California.

Legacy
Later, the Pomo were forced to live in small rancherias set aside by the federal government. For most of the 20th century, the Pomo, reduced in number, survived on such tiny reservations in poverty. Few textbooks on California history mentioned the Bloody Island incident or abuse of the native Californians.

Two separate historical markers record the site. The first, placed by the Native Sons of the Golden West on 20 May 1942 on Reclamation Road 0.3 miles off Highway 20, simply noted the location as the scene of a "battle" between U.S. soldiers under "Captain" Lyons and Indians under Chief Augustine. California Historical Landmark No. 427, describing the location as the scene of a "massacre" mostly of women and children, was placed on Highway 20 at the Reclamation Road intersection on 15 May 2005 by the State Department of Parks and Recreation in cooperation with the Lucy Moore Foundation, a non-profit organization founded to educate the California public about the massacre.

Contemporary views of the massacre and its remembrance by both Native and colonial people have been addressed in this paper.

See also
 List of massacres in California

References

Pomo tribe
Native American history of California
Pre-statehood history of California
Massacres of Native Americans
History of Lake County, California
History of racism in California
1850 in California
May 1850 events
California genocide
Massacres committed by the United States